A special election was held in  on August 26, 1816, to fill a vacancy left by the death of Elijah Brigham (F) on February 22, 1816.

Election results

Adams took his seat December 2, 1816 and was also elected in the November elections.

See also
List of special elections to the United States House of Representatives

References

Massachusetts 1816 11
1816 11
Massachusetts 1816 11
Massachusetts 11
United States House of Representatives 11
United States House of Representatives 1816 11